For Me + You is the second mixtape by American singer Austin Mahone. It was released on December 30, 2016, by Mahone's own label A.M. Music through BMG Rights Management. The mixtape features three guest appearances from Juicy J, Pitbull and 2 Chainz.

Background 
On December 13, 2016, Mahone announced his upcoming mixtape ForMe+You. He debuted the lead single, Lady (featuring Pitbull), at Pitbull's New Year's Revolution concert on December 30, the same day the mixtape would drop. This was their second collaboration, following 2014's Mmm Yeah.

Talking about the recording process with iHeart Radio, Mahone said "Putting ForMe+You together was amazing, because I spent six months in LA, and I recorded probably 90 songs. And, I just picked the best eight songs that I thought would do really well, and put them all together, and made a nice little EP type mixtape project, and put that out for everyone". Of the sound, Mahone mentioned his intention with the mixtape was to move away from the bubblegum pop he was previously known for, and "incorporate some R&B flavor this time, because that's my personal taste in music".

Track listing

Charts

Release history

References 

2016 mixtape albums
Austin Mahone albums